Oshane Andre Bailey (born 8 September 1989) is a Jamaican sprinter, who specialises in the 100 and 200 meters. He is the 2010 Jamaica National Champion in the 100 m.

At the 2008 World Junior Championships in Athletics, Bailey helped the Jamaican squad to a silver medal in the 4 × 100 m relay.

At the 2010 Commonwealth games Bailey qualified for the final as a fastest loser, but had to pull out as his pulled his hamstring on the line in the semi-final.

Oshane "Country" Bailey qualified for Jamaicas 2013 World Championships team and was in the 4x100mrelay pool.

Personal best

Competition record

1: Did not show in the final.
2: Disqualified in the semifinal.
3: Competed only in the heat.

References

External links

Behind the Improvement of Jamaica’s 2010 100m Champion

1989 births
Living people
Sportspeople from Kingston, Jamaica
Athletes (track and field) at the 2011 Pan American Games
Athletes (track and field) at the 2019 Pan American Games
Pan American Games competitors for Jamaica
Jamaican male sprinters
Athletes (track and field) at the 2010 Commonwealth Games
Athletes (track and field) at the 2018 Commonwealth Games
Athletes (track and field) at the 2015 Pan American Games
Central American and Caribbean Games silver medalists for Jamaica
Commonwealth Games medallists in athletics
Commonwealth Games bronze medallists for Jamaica
Competitors at the 2010 Central American and Caribbean Games
World Athletics Championships winners
Central American and Caribbean Games medalists in athletics
20th-century Jamaican people
21st-century Jamaican people
Medallists at the 2018 Commonwealth Games